The 1990–91 network television schedule for the four major English language commercial broadcast networks in the United States. The schedule covers primetime hours from September 1990 through August 1991. The schedule is followed by a list per network of returning series, new series, and series cancelled after the 1989–90 season.

PBS is not included; member stations have local flexibility over most of their schedules and broadcast times for network shows may vary.

New series are highlighted in bold.

All times are U.S. Eastern Time and Pacific Time (except for some live sports or events). Subtract one hour for Central, Mountain, Alaska and Hawaii-Aleutian times.

Each of the 30 highest-rated shows is listed with its rank and rating as determined by Nielsen Media Research.

Legend

Sunday

Monday

Tuesday

Wednesday

Note: Top Cops aired at 10:00 PM on CBS from July to October 1990. Police Squad! on CBS consisted of reruns of the 1982 ABC series.

Thursday

On CBS, Sons and Daughters was supposed to premiere on October 25, 1990, while The Flash is supposed to start at 8:00-9:00 p.m., but the show was shelved.

Friday

Saturday

By network

ABC 

Returning series
20/20
The ABC Sunday Night Movie
America's Funniest Home Videos
Anything but Love
China Beach
Coach
Doogie Howser, M.D.
Equal Justice
Family Matters
Father Dowling Mysteries
Full House
Growing Pains
Head of the Class
Life Goes On
MacGyver
Monday Night Football
Perfect Strangers
Primetime Live
Roseanne
Thirtysomething
Twin Peaks
Who's the Boss?
The Wonder Years
The Young Riders

New series
America's Funniest People *
Baby Talk *
Cop Rock
Davis Rules
Dinosaurs *
Eddie Dodd *
Gabriel's Fire
Going Places
Hi Honey, I'm Home! *
The Man in the Family *
Married People
My Life and Times *
Stat *
Under Cover *

Not returning from 1989–90:
The ABC Mystery Movie
Brewster Place
Capital News
Chicken Soup
Elvis
Free Spirit
H.E.L.P.
Homeroom
Just the Ten of Us
Living Dolls
The Marshall Chronicles
Mission: Impossible
Mr. Belvedere
Monopoly
Sunset Beat
Super Jeopardy!
Tim Conway's Funny America

CBS 

Returning series
48 Hours
60 Minutes
Bagdad Café
CBS Sunday Movie
Dallas
Designing Women
Doctor Doctor
Guns of Paradise (formerly known as Paradise)
The Hogan Family (moved from NBC)
Jake and the Fatman
Knots Landing
Major Dad
Murder, She Wrote
Murphy Brown
Northern Exposure
Rescue 911
Wiseguy

New series
The Antagonists *
Broken Badges *
E.A.R.T.H. Force
Evening Shade
The Family Man
The Flash
Golden Years
Good Sports *
Lenny
Morton & Hayes *
Over My Dead Body
Sons and Daughters *
Sunday Dinner *
The Trials of Rosie O'Neill
True Detectives *
Uncle Buck
WIOU
You Take the Kids *

Not returning from 1989–90:
Beauty and the Beast
The Bradys
City
Falcon Crest
The Famous Teddy Z
Grand Slam
His & Hers
Island Son
Max Monroe: Loose Cannon
Newhart
Normal Life
A Peaceable Kingdom
The People Next Door
Prime Time Pets
Room for Romance
Saturday Night with Connie Chung
Small Talk
Snoops
Sugar and Spice
Sydney
Top of the Hill
Tour of Duty
Wolf

Fox 

Returning series
America's Most Wanted
Comic Strip Live
Cops
FOX Night at the Movies
In Living Color
Married... with Children
The Simpsons
Totally Hidden Video

New series
Against the Law
American Chronicles
Babes
Beverly Hills, 90210
DEA
Get a Life
Good Grief
Haywire
Parker Lewis Can't Lose
The Sunday Comics *
Top of the Heap *
True Colors
Yearbook

Not returning from 1989–90:
21 Jump Street (moved to syndication)
Alien Nation
Beyond Tomorrow
Booker
It's Garry Shandling's Show
Glory Days
Molloy
Open House
The Outsiders
The Reporters
The Tracey Ullman Show

NBC 

Returning series
Amen
Cheers
The Cosby Show
Dear John
A Different World
Down Home
Empty Nest
The Golden Girls
Grand
Hunter
In the Heat of the Night
L.A. Law
Matlock
Midnight Caller
NBC Sunday Night Movie
NBC Monday Night at the Movies
Night Court
Quantum Leap
Real Life with Jane Pauley
Seinfeld
Shannon's Deal
Unsolved Mysteries
Wings

New series
The 100 Lives of Black Jack Savage *
American Dreamer
Blossom *
Dark Shadows *
Expose *
The Fanelli Boys
Ferris Bueller
The Fresh Prince of Bel-Air
Hull High
Lifestories
Law & Order
Parenthood
Sisters *
Sunday Best *
Working It Out

Not returning from 1989–90:
13 East
227
ALF
Ann Jillian
Baywatch (moved to syndication in September 1991)
Brand New Life
Carol and Company
A Family for Joe
FM
Hardball
The Hogan Family (moved to CBS)
The Magical World of Disney (moved to ABC)
Mancuso, F.B.I.
My Two Dads
Nasty Boys
The Nutt House
Singer & Sons
Sister Kate
True Blue
Working Girl

Note: The * indicates that the program was introduced in midseason.

References 

United States primetime network television schedules
1990 in American television
1991 in American television